The Mexico women's national rugby union sevens team qualified to the 2016 Final Olympic Qualification Tournament. In the aftermath of the 2017 RAN Women's Sevens, they made their Rugby World Cup Sevens debut in 2018. They had a more successful year at the 2019 RAN Women's Sevens tournament when they beat Jamaica in the finals and qualified for a spot at the 2020 Women's Rugby Sevens Final Olympic Qualification Tournament.

Tournament history

Rugby World Cup Sevens

Rugby Americas North Women's Sevens

Central American and Caribbean Games

Pan American Games

References

External links
 Federación Mexicana de Rugby (Spanish)

Women's national rugby sevens teams
Mexico national rugby union team
Rugby union in Mexico